MA-CHMINACA may refer to:

 ADB-CHMINACA, an analgesic medication
 AMB-CHMICA
 AMB-CHMINACA, a designer drug